Trimenia macmasteri (McMaster's silver-spotted copper) is a butterfly of the family Lycaenidae. It is found in South Africa, where it is found from Beaufort West to the Roggeveld escarpment in the Western Cape.

The wingspan is 24–32 mm for males and 27–39 mm females. Adults are on wing from September to January, with a peak from October to December. There is one generation per year.

Subspecies
Trimenia macmasteri macmasteri (Western Cape from Great Karoo along the coastal hills to the Eastern Cape)
Trimenia macmasteri mijburghi Dickson, 1980 (Namaqualand and Bushmanland in the Northern Cape and further north)

References

Butterflies described in 1968
Trimenia (butterfly)